Martingell is a surname. Notable people with the surname include:

Russell Martingell, English cricketer, father of Will
Will Martingell (1818–1897), English cricketer